Diplasia is a genus of flowering plants belonging to the family Cyperaceae.

Its native range is Trinidad to Central and Southern Tropical America.

Species:
 Diplasia karatifolia Rich.

References

Cyperaceae
Cyperaceae genera